The New Mexico State Aggies baseball team represents New Mexico State University, which is located in Las Cruces, New Mexico. The Aggies are an NCAA Division I college baseball program that competes in the Western Athletic Conference. They began competing in Division I in 1962 and joined the Western Athletic Conference in 2006.

The New Mexico State Aggies play all home games on campus at Presley Askew Field. The Aggies have played in four NCAA Tournaments. Over their 15 seasons in the Western Athletic Conference, they have won two WAC regular season titles and one WAC Tournament.

Since the program's inception, 5 Aggies have gone on to play in Major League Baseball. A total of 64 Aggies have been drafted, including Joey Ortiz who was selected in the fourth round of the 2019 Major League Baseball draft.

Conference Membership History 
1962–1970: Independent
1971–1983: Missouri Valley Conference
1984–1991: Independent
1992–2000: Big West Conference
2001–2005: Sun Belt Conference
2006–present: Western Athletic Conference

Presley Askew Field 

Presley Askew Field is a baseball stadium on the New Mexico State campus in Las Cruces, New Mexico that seats 1,000 people. It opened in 1981. A record attendance of 1,615 was set on February 27, 2015, during the home opener against Incarnate Word.

Head coaches 
Records taken from the 2020 NMSU baseball media guide.

Year-By-Year Results
Records taken from the 2020 NMSU baseball media guide.

NCAA Tournament History
The NCAA Division I baseball tournament started in 1947.
The format of the tournament has changed through the years.

Awards and honors

 12 Patriots have been named to an NCAA-recognized All-America team.
 Over their 15 seasons in the Western Athletic Conference, 26 different Patriots have been named to the all-conference first-team.

All-Americans

Freshman First-Team All-Americans

Western Athletic Conference Player of the Year

Western Athletic Conference Pitcher of the Year

Western Athletic Conference Freshman of the Year

Sun Belt Conference Player of the Year

Sun Belt Conference Freshman of the Year

Sun Belt Conference Newcomer of the Year

Taken from the 2020 NMSU baseball media guide. Updated February 28, 2020.

Aggies in the Major Leagues

Taken from the 2020 NMSU baseball media guide. Updated February 28, 2020.

See also
List of NCAA Division I baseball programs

References

 
Baseball teams established in 1907